Apterygocampus epinnulatus is a species of pipefish native to the Pacific Ocean where it occurs around the countries of the Philippines, Indonesia and Papua New Guinea.  This species grows to a length of  SL.  This species is the only known member of its genus.

References

Syngnathidae
Taxa named by Max Carl Wilhelm Weber
Fish described in 1913